Cherkizovo is an urban locality (an urban-type settlement) in Pushkinsky District of Moscow Oblast, Russia. Population:

References

Urban-type settlements in Moscow Oblast